Walter Charles Kraatz (1893–1970) was an American zoologist.

1893 births
1970 deaths
20th-century American zoologists
Scientists from Milwaukee